Julian Westermann (born April 19, 1991) is a German footballer who played in the 3. Liga for Preußen Münster.

External links

1991 births
Living people
German footballers
SC Preußen Münster players
Sportfreunde Lotte players
3. Liga players
Association football fullbacks